The algaita (also spelled alghaita, algayta or algheita) is a double reed wind instrument from West Africa, especially among the Hausa and Kanuri peoples.  Its construction is similar to the oboe-like rhaita and the zurna.  The algaita is distinguished from these other instruments by its larger, trumpet-like bell.  Instead of keys, it has open holes for fingering, similar to the zurna.

Traditional recordings
Music from the Villages of Northeastern Nigeria (Folkways, 1971)
"Music of the Cameroon - The Fulani of the North" (Lyrichord 7334)

Use in jazz recordings
Yusef Lateef, In Nigeria, (YAL Records, 1983)
Yusef Lateef, The African-American Epic Suite (1994)

See also
Kakaki
Oboe
Rhaita
Shawm
Zurna

References

H.G. Farmer, "The Arab Influence on the Western Soudan." The Musical Standard, 15 November, 1924.

External links
Alghaita page
Algaita page

Single oboes with conical bore
Hausa music
Nigerien musical instruments